Astor Shermón Henríquez Cooper (born 26 February 1983) is a Honduran footballer, who currently plays for Marathón in the Honduran National League as a defender.

Club career
Henríquez started his career at Universidad and, after a short stint at F.C. Motagua, played for Marathón for five years. He moved abroad to play alongside compatriots Erick Norales and Emil Martínez for Chinese second division side Hunan Billows in 2012.

He returned to Marathón for the 2013 Clausura championship.

International career
Henríquez made his debut for Honduras in a February 2005 UNCAF Nations Cup match against Guatemala and has earned a total of 9 caps, scoring no goals. He has represented his country at the 2005 UNCAF Nations Cup as well as at the 2005 CONCACAF Gold Cup.

His final international was a March 2008 friendly match against Colombia.

Personal life
Henríquez is married to Lilian and they have a daughter, Yolana. He has a brother and sister. His parents are divorced.

References

External links

 "Jugar y estudiar se puede, todo es sacrificarse" Astor Henríquez (Interview/bio) - Diez 
 Astor Henríquez evalúa su estadía en China [Astor Henríquez reviews his stay in China] (in Spanish) El Heraldo (Honduras)

1983 births
Living people
Sportspeople from Tegucigalpa
Association football defenders
Honduran footballers
Honduras international footballers
2005 UNCAF Nations Cup players
2005 CONCACAF Gold Cup players
F.C. Motagua players
C.D. Marathón players
Hunan Billows players
China League One players
Liga Nacional de Fútbol Profesional de Honduras players
Honduran expatriate footballers
Expatriate footballers in China
Honduran expatriate sportspeople in China